Jawbone is a 2017 British drama film directed by Thomas Q. Napper and written by Johnny Harris. The film stars Johnny Harris, Ray Winstone, Ian McShane, Michael Smiley, Luke J.I. Smith and Anna Wilson-Hall. The film was released on 12 May 2017 by Vertigo Films.

Cast  
 Johnny Harris as Jimmy McCabe
 Ray Winstone as William Carney
 Ian McShane as Joe Padgett
 Michael Smiley as Eddie
 Luke J.I. Smith as Damian

Plot 

Jimmy (Johnny Harris) is an alcoholic at a difficult time in life, single and about to be homeless. However, he has the ability to fight and utilises his skill to engage in a dangerous but well-paid illegal bout that offers him a chance to get back on his feet.

Production
Principal photography began on 29 February 2016, with filming locations including Birmingham and Stoke-on-Trent.

Release
The film was released on 12 May 2017 by Vertigo Films.

Critical response
On Rotten Tomatoes, the film has an approval rating of 96% based on 27 reviews, with an average rating of 7.23/10.

Wendy Ide of The Observer gave it 4 out of 5 and wrote: "The familiar boxing movie trajectory doesn't lessen the forceful punch of this underdog story."

References

External links
 
 

2017 films
2010s sports drama films
British sports drama films
British boxing films
Films about alcoholism
Vertigo Films films
2017 drama films
2010s English-language films
2010s British films